Ulm-Söflingen station is a railway station in the Söflingen district in the town of Ulm, located in Baden-Württemberg, Germany.

References

Söflingen